Hydrolethalus syndrome protein 1 is a protein that in humans is encoded by the HYLS1 gene.

Function 

Hyls1 is incorporated into centrioles as they are formed but is not required for centriole assembly.  However Hyls1 is required for the formation of cilia.

Clinical significance 

Mutations in this gene are associated with hydrolethalus syndrome.

References

Further reading